Richard Southcote of the Inner Temple, London and Shillingford (1570-1594) was an English politician and landowner.

He was a Member (MP) of the Parliament of England for Plympton Erle in 1593.

References

1594 deaths
Members of the Parliament of England for Plymouth
English MPs 1593
Southcott family